This is a list of vegetable soups. Vegetable soup is a common soup prepared using vegetables and leaf vegetables as primary ingredients.

Vegetable soups
 Atama soup – a vegetable and palm nut soup that originates in South Nigeria.
 
 
 Cabbage soup – prepared using sauerkraut or white cabbage
 Shchi – a Russian-style cabbage soup
 Caldo verde – a Portuguese soup made with potatoes and collard greens
 
 
 
 
 
 
 Editan – a South Nigerian soup made from editan leaf, a bitter leaf
 Eru – a specialty of the Bayangi people, of the Manyu region in southwestern Cameroon, it is prepared using finely shredded leaves of the eru
 
 Hodge Podge
 Hot and sour soup – a variety of soups from several Asian culinary traditions, some are meat-free
 Kawlata – a traditional Maltese vegetable soup
 Kenchin-jiru – a Japanese soup prepared using root vegetables and tofu
 Kesäkeitto – a Finnish traditional vegetable soup made with vegetables and butter and milk
 Kusksu – an old Maltese soup made primarily from seasonal broad beans.
 
 
 Minestrone – a thick soup of Italian origin made with vegetables, often with the addition of pasta or rice. Common ingredients include beans, onions, celery, carrots, stock, and tomatoes
 
 
 
 French onion soup – The modern version of this soup originates in Paris, France, in the 18th century, made from beef broth, and caramelized onions. It can also be prepared as a vegetarian dish.
 Patriotic soup – a soup boiled with stir-fried leaf vegetables and edible mushrooms. Created in the Guangdong Province of China during the Mongol conquest of the Song dynasty and named by Emperor Bing of Song.
 
 Pickle soup – a style of soup prepared with various types of pickled vegetables
 Rassolnik – a traditional Russian soup made from pickled cucumbers, pearl barley, and pork or beef kidneys A vegetarian variant of rassolnik also exists, usually made during Lent.
 Ribollita – a famous Tuscan bread soup, a hearty potage made with bread and vegetables.
 Sayur asem – a popular Indonesian tamarind dish. Common ingredients are peanuts, young jackfruit, melinjo, bilimbi, chayote, long beans, all cooked in tamarind-based soups and sometimes enriched with beef stock.
 Sayur lodeh – a soup prepared from vegetables in coconut milk popular in Indonesia, but most often associated with Javanese cuisine
 Sinabawang gulay – a Filipino vegetable soup made with leafy vegetables (usually moringa leaves) and various other vegetables in a broth seasoned with seafood stock or patis (fish sauce)
 Sorrel soup – also known as shchav, green borscht, or green shchi
 
 Spring soup – a soup made with fresh ingredients that are only in season for a short period during spring
 
 Vichyssoise – a thick French soup made of boiled and puréed leeks, onions and potatoes.

See also

 List of vegetable dishes
 List of soups
 Tomato soup

References

 
Vegetable soup
Vegetable